The 13th Seiyu Awards was held on March 9, 2019 at the JOQR Media Plus Hall in Minato, Tokyo. The winners of the Merit Awards, the Kei Tomiyama Award, the Kazue Takahashi Award, and the Synergy Award were announced on February 19, 2019. The rest of the winners were announced on the ceremony day. This year, there were four new award categories, which include the Foreign Movie/Series Award, the Game Award, the Influencer Award, and the Most Valuable Seiyu Award.

References

Seiyu Awards ceremonies
2019 film awards
2018 television awards
March 2019 events in Japan
2019 in Japanese cinema
2019 in Japanese television